Nea Chrani is a village of the Katerini municipality. Before 1991 it was part of the community of Kato Agios Ioannis. The 2011 census recorded 467 inhabitants in the village.

See also
 List of settlements in the Pieria regional unit

References

Populated places in Pieria (regional unit)